Asclepias viridiflora, is commonly known as green comet milkweed,  green-flower milkweed, and green  milkweed. It is a widely distributed species of milkweed (Asclepias), known from much of the eastern and central United States from Connecticut to Georgia to Arizona to Montana, as well as southern Canada. The Latin specific epithet viridiflora means green-flowered.

Asclepias viridiflora  is an erect to ascending herb up to 50 cm tall, with distinctive greenish-white flowers. The pods lack the warts and tubercules common on other species of Asclepias. It grows in moist to dry shaded roadsides, fields, and prairies.

Conservation status
It is listed as endangered in Florida, as threatened in New York (state), and as endangered in Connecticut.

Native American Ethnobotany
The Blackfoot apply a poultice of chewed roots to swellings, rashes, sore gums of nursing infants, and sore eyes. They also chew the root for sore throats, use the plant to spice soups, and use the fresh roots for food. The Brulé Lakota give pulverized roots to children with diarrhea, and  an infusion of the whole plant is taken by mothers to increase their milk.

References

viridiflora
Flora of Canada
Flora of the United States
Plants described in 1808
Plants used in Native American cuisine
Plants used in traditional Native American medicine
Taxa named by Constantine Samuel Rafinesque